Vancouver-Hastings is a provincial electoral district for the Legislative Assembly of British Columbia, Canada.

Geography

History 
This riding has elected the following Members of Legislative Assembly:

Member of Legislative Assembly 

Its MLA is Niki Sharma. She was first elected in 2020. She represents the British Columbia New Democratic Party.

Election results 

|-
 
|NDP
|Shane Simpson
|align="right"|11,726
|align="right"|54.61%
|align="right"|
|align="right"|$59,320
|-

|Independent
|Will Offley
|align="right"|130
|align="right"|0.61%
|align="right"|
|align="right"|$6,503

|align="right"|$100
|- bgcolor="white"
!align="right" colspan=3|Total Valid Votes
!align="right"|21,471
!align="right"|100%
!align="right"|
|- bgcolor="white"
!align="right" colspan=3|Total Rejected Ballots
!align="right"|205
!align="right"|0.95%
!align="right"|
|- bgcolor="white"
!align="right" colspan=3|Turnout
!align="right"|21,676
!align="right"|55.43%
!align="right"|
|}

|-
 
|NDP
|Joy MacPhail
|align="right"|9,894
|align="right"|54.01%
|align="right"|
|align="right"|$48,308

|-

|Natural Law
|Christian Prekratic
|align="right"|64
|align="right"|0.35%
|align="right"|
|align="right"|$134

|}

|-
 
|NDP
|Joy MacPhail
|align="right"|10,087
|align="right"|55.93%
|align="right"|
|align="right"|$50,916
|-

|}

References

External links 
BC Stats
Results of 2001 election (pdf)
2001 Expenditures (pdf)
Results of 1996 election
1996 Expenditures
Results of 1991 election
1991 Expenditures
Website of the Legislative Assembly of British Columbia

Politics of Vancouver
British Columbia provincial electoral districts
Provincial electoral districts in Greater Vancouver and the Fraser Valley